Tilde Ingham is a Swedish soul singer, songwriter and musician from the town of Gothenburg, Sweden.

In early 2018 she began recording her debut album, Nothing Gold Can Stay, at Spinroad Studios in Gothenburg with BRIT-award winning producer Pedro Ferreira (who previously worked with The Darkness and swedish singer Albin Lee Meldau). The album was released in September 2018 on her independent record label Vacanze Records.

In 2019, Swedish newspaper Göteborgs-Posten placed the title track Nothing Gold Can Stay in the top ten of the best songs of the decade originating from the swedish town of Gothenburg. Alongside big names such as Håkan Hellström and Laleh.

In November 2021 she released her second album, Pink Moon.

Discography

References 

1988 births
Living people
Swedish women singer-songwriters
Swedish singer-songwriters
Swedish soul singers
Swedish women musicians